Miloš Milanović (born July 5, 1981 in Belgrade) is a Serbian figure skater who competed for both Yugoslavia and Serbia and Montenegro. He is the 1997-2001 Yugoslavian national champion. In the 2000/2001 season, he competed on the Junior Grand Prix and at the Ondrej Nepela Memorial. He twice placed 35th at the European Figure Skating Championships and his highest placement at the World Figure Skating Championships was 35th, in 2002.

External links
 

Serbian male single skaters
Yugoslav male single skaters
Living people
1981 births
Sportspeople from Belgrade